The 2012–13 Edmonton Oilers season was the 34th season for the National Hockey League (NHL) franchise that was established on June 22, 1979, and 41st season including their play in the World Hockey Association. The regular season was reduced from its usual 82 games to 48 due to the 2012–13 NHL lockout.

The Oilers finished the season with a sub-.500 record and failed to qualify for the Stanley Cup playoffs for the seventh year in a row.

Off-season
On June 27, the Oilers named Ralph Krueger as their new head coach.

Arena Controversy
The Edmonton Oilers have been embroiled in a controversy with the city of Edmonton over a new arena. Oilers owner Daryl Katz has threatened to move the team to Seattle if a new arena is not built, which was panned by fans and politicians.

In October 2012, Elections Alberta released campaign finance statements which showed Katz, his family and business partners donated substantial amounts of money to the Progressive Conservatives in the closing days of the 2012 Alberta general election. Katz says it was to prevent the Wildrose Party from taking power and did not have to do with the arena. Contributions from him totalled almost 20% of the total donations during the election campaign for the Progressive Conservatives. Opposition parties in Alberta have asked Elections Alberta to investigate the donations, alleging they were made to ensure the province would kick in 100 million dollars towards a new arena.

Regular season

Standings

Playoffs
For the seventh consecutive season, the Edmonton Oilers failed to qualify for the NHL Playoffs.

Schedule and results

Regular season

Player statistics
Final stats 
Skaters

Goaltenders

†Denotes player spent time with another team before joining the Oilers.  Stats reflect time with the Oilers only.
‡Traded mid-season
Bold/italics denotes franchise record

Awards and records

Awards

Taylor Hall was also third in the voting among left-wingers for All-Star voting. Alexander Ovechkin finished second, despite the fact that Ovechkin played only four games on the left wing, with the remainder being played at right wing, where he was voted to the First All-Star Team. This prompted Professional Hockey Writers' Association President Kevin Allen to state, "We are troubled by the All-Star voting results, and plan to take a closer look at the events that led to Ovechkin winning All-Star acclaim at two positions... We know we got this wrong, and our objective is to make sure it never happens again."

Records
23: Tied Oilers record for most shots on goal in the period (1st period) on February 16, 2013.
56: New Oilers record for most shots on goal in the game on February 16, 2013.
2:43: New Oilers record for fastest three goals from start of a game by Taylor Hall at 0:16, Ladislav Smid at 2:05, and Taylor Hall at 2:43 on March 30, 2013.
3:35: New Oilers record for fastest five goals by Justin Schultz at 13:17, Nail Yakupov at 14:16, Jordan Eberle at 14:37, Nail Yakupov at 15:47, and Jerred Smithson at 16:52 in the 3rd period on April 27, 2013.
7:53: New Oilers record for fastest hat-trick from start of a game by Taylor Hall on March 30, 2013.

Milestones

Transactions 
The Oilers have been involved in the following transactions during the 2012–13 season.

Trades

Free agents signed

Free agents lost

Claimed via waivers

Lost via waivers

Player signings

Draft picks 
Edmonton's picks at the 2012 NHL Entry Draft in Pittsburgh, Pennsylvania. The Oilers possessed the first overall pick for the third-straight season.

 The Oilers' seventh-round pick went to the Los Angeles Kings as the result of a June 26, 2011, trade that sent Ryan Smyth to the Oilers in exchange for Colin Fraser and this pick.

See also 
 2012–13 NHL season

References

Edmon
Edmonton Oilers season, 2012-13
Edmonton Oilers seasons